

Events

January–March 
 January 1
 The Kingdom of Italy establishes Eritrea as its colony in the Horn of Africa.
 In Michigan, the wooden steamer Mackinaw burns in a fire on the Black River.
 January 2
 The steamship Persia is wrecked off Corsica; 130 lives are lost.
 Alice Sanger becomes the first female staffer in the White House.
 January 11 – 1890 British Ultimatum: The United Kingdom demands Portugal withdraw its forces from the land between the Portuguese colonies of Mozambique and Angola (most of present-day Zimbabwe and Zambia).
 January 15 – Ballet The Sleeping Beauty, with music by Tchaikovsky, is premiered at the Imperial Mariinsky Theatre in St. Petersburg, Russia.
 January 25
 The United Mine Workers of America is founded.
 American journalist Nellie Bly completes her round-the-world journey in 72 days.
 February 5 – The worldwide insurance and financial service brand Allianz is founded in Berlin, Germany.
 February 9 – The Weather Bureau is established within the United States Department of Agriculture.
 February 11 – The city of Araucária is founded in Brazil.
 February 17 (possible date) – The British steamship Duburg is wrecked in the South China Sea; 400 lives are lost.
 February 24 – Chicago is selected to host the Columbian Exposition.
 March 1
 The British steamship Quetia founders in the Torres Straits; 124 lives are lost.
 Léon Bourgeois succeeds Jean Antoine Ernest Constans, as French Minister of the Interior.
 March 3 – The first American football game in Ohio State University history is played in Delaware, Ohio, against Ohio Wesleyan, with the Ohio State Buckeyes winning 20–14.

 March 4 – The Forth Bridge, across the Firth of Forth in Scotland, is opened to rail traffic.
 March 8 – North Dakota State University is founded in Fargo.
 March 17 – The first railway in Transvaal, the Randtram, opens between Boksburg and Braamfontein in Johannesburg.
 March 20 – Kaiser Wilhelm II dismisses Otto von Bismarck.
 March 27
 March 1890 middle Mississippi Valley tornado outbreak: 24 significant tornadoes are spawned by one system, killing at least 146 people.
 Preston North End retain the English Football League Championship, winning their final game at Notts County
 March 28 – Washington State University is founded in Pullman.

April–June 

 April 2 – Kashihara Shrine, a landmark spot in Nara Prefecture, Japan, is officially built by Emperor Mutsuhito (Emperor of Meiji).
 April 14 – At the First International Conference of American States, in Washington D.C., The Commercial Bureau of the American Republics is founded.
 May 1 – A coordinated series of mass rallies and one-day strikes is held throughout many cities and mining towns in Europe and North America, to demand an eight-hour workday.
 May 2 – President Benjamin Harrison signs the Oklahoma Organic Act, under which Oklahoma Territory is organized, a prerequisite for later statehood.
 May 12 – The first ever official English County Championship cricket match begins in Bristol; Yorkshire beats Gloucestershire, by eight wickets.
 May 20 – Dutch artist Vincent van Gogh moves to Auvers-sur-Oise on the edge of Paris, in the care of Dr Paul Gachet, where he will produce around seventy paintings in as many days.
 May 31 – The five-story skylight Arcade opens in Cleveland, Ohio.
 June 1 – The United States Census Bureau begins using Herman Hollerith's tabulating machine to tabulate census returns using punched card input, a landmark in the history of computing hardware. Hollerith's company eventually becomes IBM.
 June 12 – In Lake Huron (Michigan), the wooden steamer Ryan is lost near Thunder Bay Island.
 June 16 – Royal Dutch Petroleum, predecessor of Royal Dutch Shell, the major worldwide energy production and sales company, is founded in the Netherlands to develop an oilfield in Pangkalan Brandan, North Sumatra.
 June 20 – The Picture of Dorian Gray (by Oscar Wilde) is published by Philadelphia-based Lippincott's Monthly Magazine (dated July).
 June 27 – Canadian-born boxer George Dixon defeats the British bantamweight champion in London, giving him claim to be the first black world champion in any sport.

July–September 
 July 1
 Heligoland–Zanzibar Treaty: Britain cedes the Heligoland islands (in the German Bight) to Germany, in return for protectorates over Wituland and the Sultanate of Zanzibar (the islands of Pemba and Unguja) in east Africa.
 1890 Japanese general election: In the first general election for the House of Representatives of Japan, about 5% of the adult male population elect a lower house of the Diet of Japan, in accordance with the new Meiji Constitution of 1889.
 The Ouija board is first released by Elijah Bond.
 July 2 – The Sherman Antitrust Act and Sherman Silver Purchase Act become United States law.
 July 3 – Idaho is admitted as the 43rd U.S. state.
 July 10 – Wyoming is admitted as the 44th U.S. state.
 July 13 – In Minnesota, storms result in the Sea Wing disaster on Lake Pepin, killing 98.
 July 14 – Lime-green is first described as a color.
 July 26 – In Buenos Aires, the Revolution of the Park takes place, forcing President Juárez Celman's resignation.
 July 27 – Death of Vincent van Gogh: van Gogh shoots himself, dying two days later.
 August 6 – At Auburn Prison in New York, William Kemmler becomes the first person to be executed in the electric chair.
 August 20 – Treaty of London: Portugal and the United Kingdom define the borders of the Portuguese colonies of Mozambique and Angola.
 August 23 – The BOVESPA stock exchange is founded in São Paulo, Brazil.
 August – Kaiser Wilhelm II and Tsar Alexander III meet at Narva.
 September 6 – Dublin association football club Bohemian F.C. is founded in the Gate Lodge, Phoenix Park.
 September 12 – Salisbury, Rhodesia, is founded.
 September 19
 The Turkish frigate  founders off Japan; 540 lives are lost.
 The University of North Texas is founded, as the Texas Normal College and Teacher Training Institute.
 September 25 — President Wilford Woodruff of the Church of Jesus Christ of Latter-day Saints issues the 1890 Manifesto ending the official practice of polygamy.

October–December 

 October 9 – The first brief flight of Clément Ader's steam-powered fixed-wing aircraft Ader Éole takes place in Satory, France.
 October 11 – In Washington, D.C., the Daughters of the American Revolution is founded.
 October 12 – The Uddevalla Suffrage Association is founded in Sweden, with a formal founding event on November 2 a month later.
 October 13
 On Lake Huron, the schooner J.F. Warner is lost in Thunder Bay (Michigan).
 The Delta Chi fraternity is founded by 11 law students at Cornell University in Ithaca, New York.
 November 4 – The first deep level London Underground (Tube) Railway, the City and South London Railway, opens officially.
 November 9 – British Royal Navy torpedo cruiser  is shipwrecked off Camariñas in Spain with the loss of 173 out of her crew of 176.
 November 21 – Edward King, Anglican bishop of Lincoln, is convicted of using ritualistic practices.
 November 23 – King William III of the Netherlands dies without a male heir, and his daughter Princess Wilhelmina becomes Queen, causing the end of the personal union of thrones with Luxembourg (which requires a male heir) so that Adolphe, Duke of Nassau becomes Grand Duke of Luxembourg.
 November 29
 The Meiji Constitution goes into effect in Japan, and its first Diet convenes.
 At West Point, New York, the United States Navy defeats the United States Army 24–0 in the first Army–Navy Game of college football.
 November – Scotland Yard, headquarters of the Metropolitan Police Service, moves to a building on London's Victoria Embankment, as New Scotland Yard.
 December 15 – Hunkpapa Lakota leader Sitting Bull is killed by police on Standing Rock Indian Reservation.
 December 27 – The British steamship Shanghai burns in the East China Sea off the coast of Anhui Province; 101 lives are lost.
 December 29 – Wounded Knee Massacre: At Wounded Knee, South Dakota, a Native American camp, the U.S. 7th Cavalry Regiment tries to disperse the non-violent "Ghost-Dance" which was promised to usher in a new era of power and freedom to Native Americans but is feared as a potential rallying tool for violent rebellion by some in the U.S. government. Shooting begins, and 153 Lakota Sioux and 25 troops are killed; about 150 flee the scene. This is the last tribe to be defeated and confined to a reservation as well as the beginning of the decline of both the American Indian Wars and the American frontier.

Date unknown 
 The folding carton box is invented by Robert Gair, a Brooklyn printer who developed production of paper-board boxes in 1879.
 The United States city of Boise, Idaho, drills the first geothermal well.
 Brown trout are introduced into the upper Firehole River, in Yellowstone National Park.
 High School Cadets is written by John Philip Sousa.
 William II of Prussia opposes Bismarck's attempt to renew the law outlawing the Social Democratic Party.
 Blackwall Buildings, Whitechapel, noted philanthropic housing, is built in the East End of London.
 English archaeologist Flinders Petrie excavates at Tell el-Hesi, Palestine (mistakenly identified as Tel Lachish), the first scientific excavation of an archaeological site in the Holy Land, during which he discovers how tells are formed.
 American geostrategist Alfred Thayer Mahan publishes his influential book The Influence of Sea Power upon History, 1660–1783.
 Francis Galton announces a statistical demonstration of the uniqueness and classifiability of individual human fingerprints.
 Alfred Tucker becomes Anglican Bishop of Eastern Equatorial Africa.
 The Ohio Northern University Marching Band is founded as a part of the military department. Becoming known as the “Star of Northwest Ohio”, they will perform regularly each football season and travel across the world through their sponsoring university.
 Japanese tractor and iron pipe brand, Kubota founded in Osaka, Japan.
 Emerson Electric, an American electronics industry giant, is founded in Missouri.

Births

January 

 January 1 – Anton Melik, Slovenian geographer (d. 1966)
 January 2 – Madoline Thomas, Welsh actress (d. 1989)
 January 4
Augustus Agar, British commodore (d. 1968)
Victor Lustig, Bohemian-born con artist (d. 1947)
 January 5 – Sarah Aaronsohn, member of the Jewish spy ring Nili (d. 1917)
 January 8 – Taixu, Chinese Buddhist activist (d. 1947)
 January 9
 Kurt Tucholsky, German-born journalist and satirist (d. 1935)
 Karel Čapek, Czech writer (d. 1938)
 January 11 – Oswald de Andrade, Brazilian Modernist writer (d.1954)
 January 13 – Jüri Uluots, 8th Prime Minister of Estonia (d. 1945)
 January 19 – Élise Rivet, French Roman Catholic nun and war heroine (d. 1945)
 January 20
Barbu Alinescu, Romanian general (d. 1952)
Boris Kozo-Polyansky, Russian botanist and evolutionary biologist (d. 1957)
 January 21 – Wesley Englehorn, American football player (d. 1993)
 January 22 – Fred M. Vinson, Chief Justice of the United States (d. 1953)
 January 28
 Néstor Guillén , Bolivian politician, 40th President of Bolivia (d. 1966)
 Robert Franklin Stroud, Birdman of Alcatraz (d. 1963)
 January 30 – Bronisław Hager, Polish activist and public health pioneer (d. 1969)

February 
 February 9 – Carolina Nabuco, Brazilian writer and translator (d. 1981)
 February 10 – Boris Pasternak, Russian writer (Doctor Zhivago), Nobel Prize laureate (declined) (d. 1960)
 February 14 – Nina Hamnett, Welsh painter (d. 1956)
 February 15 – Matome Ugaki, Japanese admiral (d. 1945)
 February 16 – Francesco de Pinedo, Italian aviator (d. 1933)
 February 17
Ioan Arhip, Romanian general (d. 1980)
Ronald Fisher, English statistician and geneticist (d. 1962)
 February 18
 Edward Arnold, American actor (d. 1956)
 Adolphe Menjou, American actor (d. 1963)
 February 24 – Marjorie Main, American actress (d. 1975)
 February 25
Dame Myra Hess, English pianist (d. 1965)
Kiyohide Shima, Japanese admiral (d. 1973)
 February 27
Freddie Keppard, American jazz musician (d. 1933)
Art Smith, American pilot (d. 1926)

March 

 March 1 – Theresa Bernstein, Polish-born American artist and writer (d. 2002)
 March 4 – Norman Bethune, Canadian doctor and humanitarian (d. 1939)
 March 8 – Eugeniusz Baziak, Polish Roman Catholic archbishop (d. 1962)
 March 9
 (new style) Vyacheslav Molotov, Soviet politician (d. 1986)
 Rupert Balfe, Australian rules footballer (d. 1915)
 March 11 – Vannevar Bush, American engineer, inventor and politician (d. 1960)
 March 19 – Nancy Elizabeth Prophet, African-American artist known for her sculpture (d. 1960)
 March 20
 Beniamino Gigli, Italian tenor (d. 1957)
 Fania Marinoff, Russian born American actress (d. 1971)
 Lauritz Melchior, Danish-American tenor (d. 1973)
 March 26 – Aaron S. "Tip" Merrill, American admiral (d. 1961)
 March 28 – Paul Whiteman, American bandleader (d. 1967)
 March 31 – William Lawrence Bragg, English physicist, Nobel Prize laureate (d. 1971)

April 
 April 6 – Anthony Fokker, Dutch aircraft manufacturer (d. 1939)
 April 7
 Paul Berth, Danish amateur footballer (d. 1969)
 Marjory Stoneman Douglas, American conservationist and writer (d. 1998)
 Harry W. Hill, American admiral (d. 1971)
 April 13
Frank Murphy, American politician and Associate Justice of the Supreme Court of the United States (d. 1949)
Dadasaheb Torne, Indian filmmaker (d. 1960)
 April 11 – Rachele Mussolini, Italian, wife of Benito Mussolini (d. 1979)
 April 15 – Percy Shaw, British inventor (d. 1976)
 April 16
 Fred Root, English cricketer (d. 1954)
 Vernon Sturdee, Australian general (d. 1966)
 April 17 – Victor Chapman, French-American fighter pilot (d. 1916)
 April 18 – Grand Duchess Maria Pavlovna of Russia (d.1958)
 April 20
 Maurice Duplessis, premier of Quebec (d. 1959)
 Adolf Schärf, President of Austria (d. 1965)
 April 21 – Michitaro Tozuka, Japanese admiral (d. 1966)
 April 24 – Masatane Kanda, Japanese general (d. 1983)
 April 26 – Edgar Kennedy, American comedic actor (d. 1948)
 April 29 – Daisy Fellowes, French society figure, writer and heiress (d. 1962)
 April 30 – Géza Lakatos, 36th Prime Minister of Hungary (d. 1967)

May 

May 1
Clelia Lollini, Italian physician (d. 1963)
Laurence Wild, 1913 NCAA Men's Basketball All-American, head coach for the Navy Midshipmen men's basketball and 30th Governor of American Samoa (d. 1971)
 May 4 – Franklin Carmichael, Canadian landscape painter and graphic designer  (d. 1945)
 May 7 – George Archainbaud, French film director (d. 1959)
 May 10 – Alfred Jodl, German general (d. 1946)
 May 11 – Woodall Rodgers, mayor of Dallas, Texas (d. 1961)
 May 15 – Katherine Anne Porter, American author (d. 1980)
 May 19 – Ho Chi Minh, Prime minister/President of North Vietnam (d. 1969)
 May 22 – Simion Coman, Romanian general (d. 1971)
 May 23 – Herbert Marshall, English actor (d. 1966)

June 

 June 1 – Frank Morgan, American actor (d. 1949)
 June 6
Ted Lewis, American jazz musician and entertainer (d. 1971)
Naomasa Sakonju, Japanese admiral and war criminal (d. 1948)
 June 10 – William A. Seiter, American film director (d. 1964)
 June 11 – Béla Miklós, 38th Prime Minister of Hungary (d. 1948)
 June 12 – Junius Matthews, American actor (d. 1978)
 June 16 – Stan Laurel, English-born actor (d. 1965)
 June 17 – Hatazō Adachi, Japanese general (d. 1947)
 June 21 – Lewis H. Brereton, American aviation pioneer and air force general (d. 1967)
 June 23 – Salvatore Papaccio, Italian tenor (d. 1977)
 June 25 – Charlotte Greenwood, American actress (d. 1977)
 June 26
 Oscar C. Badger II, American admiral (d. 1958)
 Jeanne Eagels, American actress (d. 1929)
 June 28 – William H. P. Blandy, American admiral (d. 1954)
 June 29
 Hendrikje van Andel-Schipper, Dutch supercentenarian (d. 2005)
 Pietro Montana, Italian-American sculptor, painter and teacher (d. 1978)
 June 30
 Gertrude McCoy, American actress (d. 1967)
 Paul Boffa, 5th Prime Minister of Malta (d. 1962)

July 

 July 9 – Joseph-Alphida Crête, Canadian politician (d. 1964)
 July 10 – Leo Rush, Australian rules footballer (d. 1983)
 July 11 – Arthur Tedder, 1st Baron Tedder, British air force air marshal (d. 1967)
 July 16 – Carlos Carmelo Vasconcellos Motta, Brazilian cardinal (d. 1982)
 July 18 – Frank Forde, 15th Prime Minister of Australia (d. 1983)
 July 19 – George II of Greece, King of Greece (d. 1947)
 July 20 – Verna Felton, American character actress (d. 1966)
 July 22 – Rose Kennedy, American philanthropist and matriarch of the Kennedy family (d. 1995)
 July 26
Daniel J. Callaghan, American admiral and Medal of Honor recipient (d. 1942)
Seiichi Itō, Japanese admiral (d. 1945)
 July 29 – P. S. Subrahmanya Sastri, Sanskrit scholar. First to translate Tolkāppiyam into English (d. 1978)

August 

 August 2 – Marin Sais, American film actress (d. 1971)
 August 3 – Konstantin Melnikov, Russian avant-garde architect (d. 1974)
 August 4 – Erich Weinert, German writer and political activist (d. 1953)
 August 5 – Erich Kleiber, Austrian conductor (d. 1956)
 August 10
 Angus L. Macdonald, Nova Scotia Premier (d. 1954)
 Bechara El Khoury, 2-Time Prime Minister and 2-Time President of Lebanon (d. 1964)
 August 13 – Lydia Zvereva, first Russian woman to earn a pilot's license (d. 1916)
 August 15
 Jacques Ibert, French composer (d. 1962)
 Elizabeth Bolden, American supercentenarian, last surviving person born in 1890 (d. 2006)
 August 18 – Walther Funk, German politician (d. 1960)
 August 19 – Augusta Victoria of Hohenzollern, Queen consort of Portugal in exile (d. 1966)
 August 20 – H. P. Lovecraft, American writer (d. 1937)
 August 22
Hans-Joachim Buddecke, German World War I fighter pilot and ace (d. 1918)
Cecil Kellaway, South African character actor (d. 1973)
Henry "Son" Sims, American Delta blues fiddler and songwriter (d. 1958)
 August 24 – Duke Kahanamoku, American swimmer (d. 1968)

September 

 September 8 – Dorothy Price, Irish physician (d. 1954)
 September 9
 Hilda Abbott, wife of the administrator of the Northern Territory (d. 1984)
 Colonel Harland Sanders, founder of KFC (d. 1980)
 September 10
 Elsa Schiaparelli, French couturiere (d. 1973)
 Sir Mortimer Wheeler, British archaeologist (d. 1976)
 September 15
 Agatha Christie, English writer (d. 1976)
 Frank Martin, Swiss composer (d. 1974)
 September 20
 Jelly Roll Morton, American jazz pianist, composer and bandleader (d. 1941)
 Rachel Bluwstein, Israeli poet (d. 1931)
 September 21 – Max Immelmann, German World War I fighter ace (d. 1916)
 September 23
 Kakuji Kakuta, Japanese admiral (d. 1944)
 Friedrich Paulus, German field marshal (d. 1957)
 September 24 – A. P. Herbert, English humorist, novelist, playwright and law reform activist (d. 1971)

October 

 October 1
 Katherine Corri Harris, American socialite and actress, first wife of John Barrymore (d. 1927)
 Stanley Holloway, English actor (d. 1982)
 Alice Joyce, American silent film actress (d. 1955)
 Blanche Oelrichs, American poet, second wife of John Barrymore (d. 1950)
 October 2 – Groucho Marx, American comedian (d. 1977)
 October 3 – Emilio Portes Gil, Mexican teacher, journalist, lawyer and substitute President of Mexico, 1928–1930 (d. 1978)
 October 6 – Jack Rockwell, Mexican-American actor (d. 1947)
 October 8
Henrich Focke, German aviation pioneer (d. 1979)
Eddie Rickenbacker, race car driver and American World War I fighter pilot (d. 1973)
 October 9 – Aimee Semple McPherson, Canadian-American Pentecostal Evangelist (d. 1944)
 October 13 – Conrad Richter, American novelist and short story writer (d. 1968)
 October 14 – Dwight D. Eisenhower, US general and 34th President of the United States (d. 1969)
 October 16
 Michael Collins, Irish patriot (d. 1922)
 Paul Strand, American photographer (d. 1976)
 October 17 – Roy Kilner, English cricketer (d. 1928)
 October 20 – Sherman Minton, American politician and Associate Justice of the Supreme Court of the United States (d. 1965)
 October 23 – Abdul Hamid Karami, 16th Prime Minister of Lebanon (d. 1950)
 October 25 – Floyd Bennett, American aviator and explorer (d. 1928)
 October 26 – John Aae, Norwegian politician (d. 1968)
 October 29 – Hans-Valentin Hube, German army general (d. 1944)

November 

 November 4 – Saadi Al Munla, 17th Prime Minister of Lebanon (d. 1975)
 November 7
Tomitarō Horii, Japanese general (d. 1942)
Jan Matulka, American painter (d. 1972)
 November 8 – Conrad Weygand, German chemist (d. 1945)
 November 9 – Grigory Kulik, Soviet military officer, Marshal of the Soviet Union (d. 1950)
 November 16 
George Seldes, American investigative journalist (d. 1995)
 Elpidio Quirino, 6th President of the Philippines (d. 1956)
 November 20 – Leon Cadore, American baseball pitcher (d. 1968)
 November 22 – Charles de Gaulle, President of France (d. 1970)
 November 23 – El Lissitzky, Russian artist and architect (d. 1941)

December 
 December 5
 David Bomberg, English painter (d. 1957)
 Fritz Lang, Austrian-born film director, screenwriter and actor (d. 1976)
 December 6 – Dion Fortune, British occultist (d. 1946)
 December 8 – Bohuslav Martinů, Czech composer (d. 1959)
 December 10
 László Bárdossy, 33rd Prime Minister of Hungary (d. 1946)
 Henry Louis Larsen, American Marine Corps General; Governor of American Samoa and Governor of Guam (d. 1962)
 December 11 – Carlos Gardel, Argentine tango singer (d. 1935)
 December 12 – Charles Basil Price, Canadian soldier and politician (d. 1975)
 December 17 – Prince Joachim of Prussia (suicide 1920)
 December 20 – Jaroslav Heyrovský, Czech chemist, Nobel Prize laureate (d. 1967)
 December 21 – Hermann Joseph Muller, American geneticist, recipient of the Nobel Prize in Physiology or Medicine (d. 1967)
 December 25 – Robert Ripley, American collector of odd facts (d. 1949)
 December 26
 Konstantinos Georgakopoulos, Greek lawyer and professor, 152nd Prime Minister of Greece (d. 1973)
 Uncle Charlie Osborne, Appalachian fiddler (d. 1992)
 December 30
 Lanoe Hawker, British fighter pilot (d. 1916)
 Adolfo Ruiz Cortines, 47th President of Mexico (d. 1973)

Date unknown 
 Ștefan Balaban, Romanian general (d. 1962)
 Sava Caracaș, Romanian general (d. 1945)
 Hatı Çırpan, Turkish politician (d. 1956)

Deaths

January–June 

 January 2 – Julián Gayarre, Spanish opera singer (b. 1844)
 January 7 – Augusta of Saxe-Weimar-Eisenach, Empress Consort of William I, German Emperor (b. 1811)
 January 18 – King Amadeo I of Spain (b. 1845)
 February 18 – Gyula Andrássy, Hungarian statesman, 4th Prime Minister of Hungary (b. 1823)
 February 22
 John Jacob Astor III, American businessman (b. 1822)
 Carl Heinrich Bloch, Danish painter (b. 1834)
 January 23 – Emily Jane Pfeiffer, Welsh poet and philanthropist (b. 1827)
 March 3 – Innocenzo da Berzo, Italian Capuchin friar and blessed (b. 1844)
 March 7 – Karl Rudolf Friedenthal, Prussian statesman (b. 1827)
 March 9 – Sir Mangaldas Nathubhoy, Indian politician (b. 1832)
 March 16 – Princess Zorka of Montenegro (b. 1864)
 March 23 – Mary Jane Katzmann, Canadian historian (b. 1828)
 April 1
 David Wilber, American politician (b. 1820)
 Alexander Mozhaysky, Russian aeronautical pioneer (b. 1825)
 April 11
 David de Jahacob Lopez Cardozo, Dutch Talmudist (b. 1808)
 Joseph Merrick (The Elephant Man), British oddity (b. 1862)
 April 18 – Paweł Bryliński, Polish sculptor (b. 1814)
 April 19 – James Pollock, American politician (b. 1810)
 May 22 – Eduard von Fransecky, Prussian general (b. 1807)
 June 1 – Camilo Castelo Branco, Portuguese writer (b. 1825)
 June 24 – Subba Row, Hindu theosophist (b. 1856)
 June 30 – Samuel Parkman Tuckerman, American composer (b. 1819)

July–December 

 July 7 – Henri Nestlé, Swiss confectioner and the founder of Nestlé (b. 1814)
 July 9 – Clinton B. Fisk, American philanthropist and temperance activist (b. 1828)
 July 13
 John C. Frémont, American explorer and military officer (b. 1813)
 Johann Voldemar Jannsen, Estonian journalist and poet (b. 1819)
 July 15 – Gottfried Keller, Swiss writer (b. 1819)
 July 25 – Shaikh Mohamed bin Khalifa bin Salman Al Khalifa, Ruler of Bahrain (b. 1813)
 July 29 – Vincent van Gogh, Dutch painter (b. 1853)
 August 6 – William Kemmler, American murderer, first person executed in the electric chair (b. 1860)
 August 10 – John Boyle O'Reilly, Irish-born poet, journalist and fiction writer (b. 1844)
 August 11 – John Henry Newman, English Roman Catholic Cardinal (b. 1801)
 August 27 – Juan Seguín, American soldier and politician (b. 1806)
 October 4 – Catherine Booth, Mother of The Salvation Army (b. 1829)
 October 17 – Julian Gutowski, Polish politician (b. 1823)
 October 20 – Richard Francis Burton, English explorer, linguist, soldier (b. 1821)
 October 26 – Carlo Collodi, Italian writer (The Adventures of Pinocchio) (b. 1826)
 November 3 – Ulrich Ochsenbein, member of the Swiss Federal Council (b. 1811)
 November 4 – Félix du Temple de la Croix, French Army Captain & aviation pioneer (b. 1823)
 November 7 – Comanche, American horse, survivor of Custer's cavalry at the Battle of the Little Bighorn
 November 8 – César Franck, Belgian composer and organist (b. 1822)
 November 11 – Marie-Charles David de Mayréna, French adventurer and self-styled King of Sedang (b. 1842)
 December 21 – Sherman Conant, American soldier and politician (b. 1839)
 November 23 – King William III of the Netherlands (b. 1817)
 November 24 – August Belmont, Sr., Prussian-born financier (b. 1816)
 December 15 – Sitting Bull, Native American chief (b. c. 1831)
 December 21 – Johanne Luise Heiberg, Danish actress (b. 1812)
 December 23 – Alphonse Lecointe, French general and politician (b. 1817)
 December 26 – Heinrich Schliemann, German archaeologist (b. 1822)
 December 31 – Pancha Carrasco, Costa Rican war heroine (b. 1826)

References

Further reading and year books 
 1890 Annual Cyclopedia online; highly detailed coverage of "Political, Military, and Ecclesiastical Affairs; Public Documents; Biography, Statistics, Commerce, Finance, Literature, Science, Agriculture, and Mechanical Industry" (1891); compilation of facts and primary documents; worldwide coverage.